The 2020 United States House of Representatives elections in Maine were held on November 3, 2020, to elect the two U.S. representatives from the state of Maine, one from each of the state's two congressional districts. The elections coincided with the 2020 U.S. presidential election, as well as other elections to the House of Representatives, elections to the United States Senate and various state and local elections. The election was conducted with ranked choice voting, as per the result of a referendum passed in 2016.

Party Primaries were initially scheduled to take place on June 9, 2020. They were rescheduled by Gov. Janet Mills to July 14, 2020, due to the COVID-19 pandemic.  Mills' executive order also expanded the ability to request absentee ballots, which may now be done up to and on election day. Parties that qualified to participate in the 2020 Primary Election were the Democratic Party, the Green Independent Party, and the Republican Party. Two candidates in District 1 and four candidates in district 2 filed petitions with the Secretary of State by March 16, 2020. Non-party candidates could also file petitions to be included on the ballot by June 1, 2020.

Overview

District 1

The 1st district encompasses the southern coastal area of the state, taking in Portland, Augusta, Brunswick and Saco. The incumbent is Democrat Chellie Pingree, who was re-elected with 58.8% of the vote in 2018.

Democratic primary

Candidates

Declared
Chellie Pingree, incumbent U.S. Representative

Primary results

Republican primary

Candidates

Declared
 Jay Allen, physician

Primary results

General election

Predictions

Polling

Results

District 2

The 2nd district covers most of northern rural Maine, including the cities of Lewiston, Bangor, Auburn and Presque Isle. The incumbent is Democrat Jared Golden, who flipped the district and was elected with 50.6% of the vote in 2018, making him the first member of Congress to be elected by ranked choice voting. Donald Trump won the district in the concurrent presidential election.

Democratic primary

Candidates

Declared
Jared Golden, incumbent U.S. Representative

Endorsements

Primary results

Republican primary

On the ballot
Dale Crafts, former state representative
Adrienne Bennett, press secretary for former Governor Paul LePage
Eric Brakey, former state senator and nominee for U.S. Senate in 2018

Declined
Travis Mills, retired U.S. Army staff sergeant
Bruce Poliquin, former U.S. Representative

Endorsements

Polling

Primary results
Both Bennett and Brakey conceded the race to Crafts the day after the primary.  As Crafts did not get 50% of the vote, Maine's ranked choice system calls for the second choices of the last place candidate's votes to be distributed to the other candidates, whether or not the candidates concede the race.  Crafts criticized this as a waste of taxpayer dollars, and both Bennett and Brakey said they would refuse to accept the results of the ranked choice tabulation. Maine Secretary of State Matthew Dunlap said whether the concessions could stop the tabulation was "a question for lawyers", but that the tabulation would begin on July 18.  Crafts called on the Maine Legislature to examine this issue.  Dunlap's office, while not responding directly to Crafts' call to action on the Legislature, did agree with Crafts that Dunlap was performing his duty under the law.

% (gross) = percent of all valid votes cast (without eliminating the exhausted votes)

% (net) = percent of votes cast after eliminating the exhausted votes

General election

Predictions

Endorsements

Polling

Jared Golden vs. generic Republican

Results

See also
 2020 Maine elections

Notes

Partisan clients

References

External links
 Elections & Voting division of the Maine Secretary of State
 
 
  (State affiliate of the U.S. League of Women Voters)
 

Official campaign websites for 1st district candidates
 Jay Allen (R) for Congress
 Chellie Pingree (D) for Congress

Official campaign websites for 2nd district candidates
 Dale Crafts (R) for Congress
 Jared Golden (D) for Congress

2020
Maine
United States House of Representatives